Atlan is a fantasy novel by British writer Jane Gaskell. It was first published in 1965. It is the second book in the Atlan series set in prehistoric South America and Atlantis. The first book in the series was  The Serpent, and Atlan is followed by two more books, The City and Some Summer Lands.

Plot summary

Apart from the prologue, Atlan is told from the first person point of view of the main character Cija. Following the events of The Serpent, Cija has married Zerd, a half-human, half-reptilian warlord. Zerd's army has conquered the hidden continent of Atlan (a clear reference to Atlantis) and Zerd now rules as its Emperor with Cija by his side.

Unfortunately for Cija, Zerd has not given up his philandering ways and the couple become estranged. The book details Cija's travails in Atlan as she must survive assassination attempts, bandits, and various misadventures. Complicating matters is an invasion by the Northern army, headed by Sedili, Zerd's ex-wife.

References

External links

1965 American novels
1965 fantasy novels
American fantasy novels
Atlantis in fiction
Hodder & Stoughton books